Peter Chapman may refer to:

 Peter Chapman (politician) (born 1950), Scottish Conservative politician
 Peter Chapman (murderer) (born 1977), English convicted murderer
 Peter Chapman (cartoonist) (1925–2016), Australian comic book writer and illustrator
 Coins (composer) (Peter Chapman, born 1980), Canadian music producer and composer

See also
 Peter la Chapman (fl. 1306), English politician
 Peter Chatman, a pseudonym of American blues pianist Memphis Slim (1915–1988)